Conizonia warnieri is a species of beetle in the family Cerambycidae. It was described by Hippolyte Lucas in 1849. It is known from Tunisia and Algeria.

Varieties
 Conizonia warnieri var. brunnea Breuning, 1954
 Conizonia warnieri var. cocquerelii Fairmaire, 1873
 Conizonia warnieri var. ruficornis Breuning, 1954
 Conizonia warnieri var. vittithorax Pic, 1900

References

Saperdini
Beetles described in 1849